The 2012 Atlantic Coast Conference men's soccer tournament will be the 26th edition of the ACC Men's Soccer Tournament. The tournament will decide the Atlantic Coast Conference champion and guaranteed representative into the 2012 NCAA Division I Men's Soccer Championship. The tournament will be held from November 5–11, with the Maryland SoccerPlex in Boyds, Maryland being host to the semifinal and championship rounds.

Qualification

Bracket

Schedule

Play-in round

Quarterfinals

Semifinals

ACC Championship

Statistical leaders

See also 
 Atlantic Coast Conference
 2012 NCAA Division I men's soccer season
 2012 NCAA Division I Men's Soccer Championship

References 

ACC Men's Soccer Tournament
ACC Men's Soccer Tournament
ACC Men's Soccer Tournament